"Me and My Arrow" is a song written and recorded by American singer-songwriter Harry Nilsson for his 1970 album The Point! It was also released as a single in 1971, reaching number 34 on the US Billboard Hot 100 and number 3 on the Adult Contemporary chart.

The song was composed as the theme for The Point, a story about  Oblio, the pointless boy, and his dog Arrow.

Chart history

In popular culture
Featured in the season 24 episode "To Cur with Love" of The Simpsons as the theme for Homer Simpson and his dog Bongo.
Used in a series of television commercials promoting the Plymouth Arrow compact car.

References

1970 songs
Songs written by Harry Nilsson
Harry Nilsson songs